Clive Terrelonge (born 30 June 1969) is a Jamaican former track and field athlete and coach. University of Connecticut. Before coaching, he was an accomplished collegiate and professional athlete who specialized in the 800m and 400m.

Terrelonge was twice an Olympian for Jamaica, competing in the 1992 Summer Olympics in Barcelona and in 1996 Olympic Games in Atlanta. At the 1995 IAAF World Indoor Championships, Terrelonge became the first Jamaican to win a World Championship gold medal in the 800 metres.

While competing for Lincoln University (Pennsylvania), Terrelonge earned 19 Division III All-America honors in the 400m, 800m and the 4x400-meter relay. He is a former NCAA double 400 and triple 800-meter indoor/outdoor champion and held the 800-meter NCAA Division III outdoor record until Nick Symmonds of Willamette University broke it in spring 2006.

Terrelonge was inducted into the NCAA Division III Hall of Fame in 2005.

See also
 List of male middle-distance runners

References

External links
 UConn profile
 NCAA Hall of Fame
 

1969 births
Living people
Athletes (track and field) at the 1992 Summer Olympics
Athletes (track and field) at the 1994 Commonwealth Games
Athletes (track and field) at the 1996 Summer Olympics
College men's track and field athletes in the United States
Commonwealth Games competitors for Jamaica
Jamaican male middle-distance runners
Jamaican male sprinters
Lincoln University (Pennsylvania) alumni
Olympic athletes of Jamaica
Sportspeople from Kingston, Jamaica
UConn Huskies track and field coaches
World Athletics Indoor Championships winners